Scheidt is a borough (Stadtteil) of the city of Saarbrücken, in the southwest of Germany. Population (2020): 4,087.

References

Saarbrücken